Dō-maru (胴丸), or "body wrap", was a type of chest armour (dou or dō) worn by the samurai class of feudal Japan. Dō-maru first started to appear in the 11th century as an armour for lesser samurai and retainers. Like the ō-yoroi style it became more common in the Genpei War at the end of the 12th century.

Description
There were quite a number of similar styles and types of Japanese armor; the dō-maru is particularly defined by the fact that a dō-maru opens on the right side as opposed to the haramaki style which opened in the back and the ō-yoroi the cuirass of which is completely open on the right side requiring a separate plate (waidate) to cover the right side. The ō-yoroi was a heavy box like armour meant for use on horseback, and was expensive to make. The dō-maru, like the haramaki had more skirt plates (kusazuri) than an ō-yoroi and was lighter, closer-fitting, and cheaper to create. The dō-maru was easier to fight with on foot and eventually even higher status samurai adopted it over the ō-yoroi.

Dō-maru were constructed from small scales of leather or metal laced into plates with cord and lacquered. Then each plate was laced together to form the armor. Due to the weight of iron, armour makers limited its use to the most vital parts of the armor and used leather for the remainder.

See also 
 List of National Treasures of Japan (crafts-others)

References

External links 

 Warrior in Do-Maru Armor an illustrated explanation of Do-Maru armor components
 Anthony Bryant's web site

Samurai armour
11th-century fashion